"Dance Away" is a song by the English rock band Roxy Music. Released in April 1979, it was the second single to be taken from their album Manifesto, and became one of the band's most famous songs, reaching number 2 in the UK and spending a total of 14 weeks on the charts, the longest chart residency of a Roxy Music single. Although it did not make number 1, it became the ninth biggest selling single in the UK in 1979. It did make it to number 1 on the Irish Singles Chart and held that position for one week.

"Dance Away" was originally written by Bryan Ferry for his 1977 solo album In Your Mind, but did not make the final track listing. It was then planned for inclusion on his 1978 album The Bride Stripped Bare, but again was not included. It was finally completed and released on Roxy Music's Manifesto, the band's first studio album in four years.

Cash Box said it is "Roxy Music's most commercial effort to date" and that the highlights are "Andy Mackay's sax lines, Phil Manzanera's guitar treatments and an entrancing percussive' sound."

The single version was a different shorter edit and mix compared to the original album version. As with their next single "Angel Eyes", the single version of "Dance Away" replaced the album version in subsequent releases. While the 1999 re-mastered version of the "Manifesto" album restored the original version of "Angel Eyes", it still retained the single mix of "Dance Away" in place of the original, making the Thrill of It All box set the only release on which the LP version of the song could be found, until the release of the box set The Complete Studio Recordings 1972-1982 in 2012.

Personnel
 Bryan Ferry – vocals, keyboards
 Andy Mackay – oboe, saxophone
 Phil Manzanera – electric guitar
 Alan Spenner – bass
 Richard Tee – piano
 Rick Marotta – drums
 Steve Ferrone – percussion, claves

References

1979 singles
Roxy Music songs
Songs written by Bryan Ferry
British soft rock songs
Island Records singles
Polydor Records singles
Songs about dancing
1979 songs